Elkathurthy is village and  mandal headquarter in Hanumakonda district of the Indian state of Telangana.

Villages

Total Number of Villages in this Mandal are (13).

 Baopet
 Damera
 Dandepalle
 Elkathurthy
 Gopalpur
 Jeelgul
 Keshwapur
 Kothulnaduma
 Penchakalpeta
 Suraram
 Thimmapur
 Vallabhapur
 Veeranarayanapur

References

Villages in Hanamkonda district